Gáň is a village and municipality in Galanta District of the Trnava Region of south-west Slovakia.

History
In historical records the village was first mentioned in 1113.

Geography
The municipality lies at an elevation of 125 metres and covers an area of 6.174 km². It has a population of about 695 people.

Genealogical resources

The records for genealogical research are available at the state archive "Statny Archiv in Bratislava, Slovakia"

 Roman Catholic church records (births/marriages/deaths): 1691-1921 (parish B)
 Lutheran church records (births/marriages/deaths): 1701-1826 (parish B)

See also
 List of municipalities and towns in Slovakia

References

External links

Gan webpages
http://www.statistics.sk/mosmis/eng/run.html 
Surnames of living people in Gan

Villages and municipalities in Galanta District